Getting Even (also known as Hostage: Dallas) is a 1986 American film directed by Dwight H. Little.

Plot

A soldier-of-fortune, Tag Taggert, played by Edward Albert, steals some Russian nerve gas from Afghanistan, and brings it to the U.S. to be analyzed. A greedy millionaire rancher, played by Joe Don Baker, finds out about it, steals it and uses it in an extortion scheme.  Audrey Landers plays the lead FBI agent-in-charge tasked with thwarting the extortion scheme.

Production 
In an interview, director Dwight H. Little explained that Getting Even was a "vanity project" for members of a wealthy Texas oil family. "They owned helicopters, a Lear jet, ranches. Their only condition was that we used all of their stuff. The whole movie was written and devised around what they owned", said Little.

Actress Audrey Landers was dating one of the financiers of the film, according to Little. She also helped getting a lot of local acting talent, many of whom she knew from her work on the TV show Dallas.

Little also explained that stuntman Paul Baxley was instrumental in making the film: "He really helped me to figure out the helicopter sequences, the explosions, how to do all of it safely. He was super knowledgeable. If he wanted a guy to drop from a helicopter, he knew who to call. Paul Baxley was my secret weapon." The final scene, which takes place on top of Reunion Tower, was filmed there with permission. The financiers knew the owners of the restaurant on top of the tower. According to Little, the helicopter from which Joe Don Baker's character shoots at Edward Albert's character, was really flying only thirty feet from the tower.

Cast
 Edward Albert as 'Tag' Taggert
 Audrey Landers as Paige Starson
 Joe Don Baker as King R. Kenderson
 Rod Pilloud as Doc
 Billy Streater as Ryder
 Blue Deckard as Kurt
 Dan Shackleford as Roule
 Caroline Williams as Molly
 Woody Watson as Max

References

External links

1986 films
Films scored by Christopher Young
Films directed by Dwight H. Little
1986 action films
The Samuel Goldwyn Company films
Films set in Dallas
Cold War spy films
1980s English-language films
American spy action films
1980s American films